The Atlanta and Charlotte Air Line Railway emerged from the 1877 re-organization of the Atlanta and Richmond Air Line Railway.  Later, in 1894, it became part of the Southern Railway. It was finally merged into the Norfolk Southern Railway in 1996.

The line is currently used by Amtrak's Crescent service, previously known as the Southern Crescent.

See also
 Airline Belle

References 

Predecessors of the Southern Railway (U.S.)
Defunct Georgia (U.S. state) railroads
Railway lines in Atlanta
Railway companies established in 1877
Railway companies disestablished in 1996
Defunct South Carolina railroads
Defunct North Carolina railroads
American companies established in 1877